The 2016 CIS/CCA Curling Championships are held from March 20 to 23 at the Kelowna Curling Club in Kelowna, British Columbia. The host university of the event is UBC Okanagan. The winning teams will also represent Canada at the 2017 Winter Universiade in Almaty, Kazakhstan.

Men

Teams
The teams are listed as follows:

Round-robin standings
Final round-robin standings

Playoffs

Semifinals
Wednesday, March 23, 9:00

Bronze-medal game
Wednesday, March 23, 14:30

Final
Wednesday, March 23, 14:30

Women

Teams
The teams are listed as follows:

Round-robin standings
Final round-robin standings

Playoffs

Semifinals
Wednesday, March 23, 9:00

Bronze-medal game
Wednesday, March 23, 14:30

Final
Wednesday, March 23, 14:30

References

External links

Curling in British Columbia
Sport in Kelowna
CIS/CCA Curling Championships
CIS/CCA Curling Championships